Craig Boddington is a professional hunter, TV show host, author and Marine.

Biography
Craig Boddington was born in Kansas, U.S.A., in 1952. As a teenager, when not involved with hunting and shooting, he spent a lot of time pursuing Boy Scout activities. At 17 years of age, he became the youngest person to become Activities Director at his regional Boy Scout camp. Boddington attended the University of Kansas graduating with an English degree and a regular commission in the United States Marine Corps.

He retired from the USMC Reserves in 2005 with the rank of colonel after service in the Gulf War in 1991 and Kuwait in 2001.

Career
Whilst at college, Boddington began writing and continued while on active duty. In 1978, he left active service and  worked as a hunting consultant/booking agent for International Hunting Consultants based in Santa Monica.  He remained in the Marine Corps Reserves, achieving the rank of brigadier general select before retiring.

In 1979, he joined Petersen Publishing Company, where he served as Associate Editor for Guns & Ammo,  Editor for Guns & Ammo Speciality Publications, Field Editor for American Blade, Executive Editor at Petersen's Hunting magazine and from 1983 to 1994 Editor of Petersen's Hunting magazine.

His current position with Intermedia Outdoors (formerly Petersen's) is Executive Field Editor, Intermedia Outdoor Group, including Guns & Ammo, Petersen's Hunting, and RifleShooter.  He is a member of Gander Mountain's Elite Pro-Staff  and also serves as a consultant to SureFire LLC.

Boddington has written over 4000 published magazine articles.  He is the author of 25 books on hunting and shooting and has been published in England, Australia, Scotland, Canada, Germany, Spain, and the United States.

He is the host of Hornady's The Boddington Experience on the Sportsman Channel.

Published books
 America—The Men And Their Guns That Made Her Great (Collection, Caroline House, 1981)
 Campfires And Game Trails (Winchester Press, 1985)
 From Mt. Kenya To The Cape—Ten Years Of African Hunting (Safari Press, 1987)
 Deer Hunting  Coast To Coast (With Bob Robb, Safari Press 1989)
 Shots At Big Game (Stackpole, 1989)
 Safari Rifles (Safari Press, 1991)
 Hunter's Handbook (Mallard Press, 1992)
 American Hunting Rifles (Safari Press, 1995)
 Whitetail Medicine (Derrydale Publishing, 1995)
 Where Lions Roar (Safari Press, 1997)
 Make It Accurate (Safari Press, 1999)
 Search For The Spiral Horn (Safari Press, 2002)
 The African Experience (Safari Press, 2001)
 The Perfect Shot (Safari Press, 2002)
 African Hunter II (With Peter Flack And Others) (Safari Press, 2004)
 Fair Chase In North America (Boone And Crockett Club, 2004)
 A Life On Safari (By Geoff Broom With Craig Boddington) (Mission Trails, 2005)
 Buffalo! (Safari Press, 2005)
 Leopard (With Tim Danklef And Dave Fulson) (Mission Trails, 2007)
 Safari Rifles II (Safari Press, 2008)
 Big Game Argentina (Patagonia Press, 2009)

Awards
 Inaugural Recipient of Peter Hathaway Capstick Literary Award from Safari Club International, 1997.
 Shooting Sports Writer of the Year Award, Outdoor Writers Association of America, 1999.
 Recipient of Leupold “Jack Slack Writer of the Year” Award, 2005.
 Safari Club International's CJ McElroy Award, 2008.
 Chancellor Foundation "Conservationist of the Year", 2008.
 Conklin Award, 2009.
 Zeiss Writer of the Year, 2010.
 JJ Malek Golden Award, 2010.
 Weatherby Award, 2017.

References

External links
 Official website

1953 births
Living people
American hunters
United States Marine Corps officers
United States Marine Corps reservists
United States Marine Corps personnel of the War in Afghanistan (2001–2021)
University of Kansas alumni